Hay Road is a 2012 Portuguese action adventure Western film directed by Rodrigo Areias.

Plot
The film is set in the 1900s.

Cast
 Nuno Melo

Reception

Critical response
On Público, Vasco Câmara gave the film a rating of one out of five stars, Jorge Mourinha gave it three out of five, and Luís Miguel Oliveira gave it two out of five.

Accolades

References

External links
 
 Hay Road on Cineuropa

2012 films
2012 Western (genre) films
Portuguese Western (genre) films
2010s Portuguese-language films